Ignatius II was the Patriarch of Antioch and head of the Syriac Orthodox Church from 878 until his death in 883.

Biography
Ignatius was born in the 9th century and became a monk at the monastery of Harbaz. He was chosen to succeed John IV as patriarch of Antioch and was consecrated on 5 June 878 (AG 1189) by Timothy of Samosata at a synod at the monastery of Saint Zacchaeus at Raqqa, which was attended by four bishops. Upon his consecration, Ignatius issued twelve canons.

He soon came into conflict with Sergius, archbishop of Tikrit and ex officio Grand Metropolitan of the East, the highest-ranking prelate amongst the eastern bishops (bishops of the former Sasanian Empire). Sergius had lost the recognition of the eastern bishops after he had allocated dioceses to Elisha' and Bar Hadh Bshabba, who had been excommunicated by both Patriarch John IV and Basil II Lazarus, Sergius' predecessor as archbishop of Tikrit and Grand Metropolitan of the East. He was thus not invited to attend Ignatius' consecration, to which he responded by withholding his recognition of Ignatius and refused to have his name proclaimed in the east.

The dispute between Ignatius and Sergius was eventually resolved after they were imprisoned and fined 2000 dinars. He served as patriarch of Antioch until his death on 26 March 883 (AG 1194) at Meriba, where he was buried.

Episcopal succession
As patriarch, Ignatius ordained the following bishops:

Severus, bishop of Res-Kepha
Abraham, archbishop of Anazarbus
Sergius, archbishop of Cyrrhus
Cyriacus, archbishop of Edessa
Abraham, bishop of Aleppo
John, bishop of Germanicia
Michael, bishop of Samosata
John, archbishop of Amida
Abraham, bishop of Circesium
Elias, bishop of Hadath
Simeon, bishop of Zuptara
Cyril, bishop of Maipherqat
Gabriel, bishop of Sarug
Jacob, bishop of Baalbek
Cyriacus, archbishop of Anazarbus
Constantine, bishop of Harran
Aaron, archbishop of Maipherqat
Gabriel, bishop of Arabia
Matthew, archbishop of Dara
Iwannis, bishop of Abadqawan 
Severus, archbishop of Segestan
Severus, archbishop of Raqqa
Theodosius, bishop of Doula
John, archbishop of Mabbogh
John, bishop of Doliche
Severus, archbishop of Jerusalem

References
Notes

Citations

Bibliography

9th-century Oriental Orthodox archbishops
Syriac Patriarchs of Antioch from 512 to 1783
883 deaths
Year of birth unknown
Upper Mesopotamia under the Abbasid Caliphate
9th-century people from the Abbasid Caliphate
Prisoners and detainees of the Abbasid Caliphate